Oda Cathrine Lunne Mastad (born 1 January 1997) is a Norwegian handball player, who plays for Fana and the Norwegian national team.

On 2 March 2023, Mastad made her debut on the national team.

References
 

1997 births
Living people
People from Trondheim
Norwegian female handball players